{{DISPLAYTITLE:C3H8O10P2}}
The molecular formula C3H8O10P2 (molar mass: 266.035 g/mol) may refer to:

 1,3-Bisphosphoglyceric acid (1,3-BPG)
 2,3-Bisphosphoglyceric acid (2,3-BPG)

Molecular formulas